Terence Rhoderic Hudson Cole,  (born 31 October 1937), is an Australian jurist, known best for presiding over two Australian Government Royal Commissions.

Background
Cole was born in Longreach, Queensland, and was educated at Fort Street High School in Sydney; where he was school Vice Captain. He graduated from the University of Sydney in 1961 with a BA LL.B.

Legal career
Cole practiced as a solicitor before he was admitted to the bar in 1962 where he represented in commercial and common law matters and before the Land and Environment Court. He was appointed a Queen's Counsel in 1976.

Cole was appointed as a judge to the Supreme Court of New South Wales in 1988 in the Common Law Division; and then in the Commercial Division of the Court until 1994. He was promoted as a judge of the Court of Appeal of New South Wales in 1994 and served until 1998. Between 1998 and 2000 Cole became a Court appointed referee, arbitrator and mediator in various commercial disputes.

With an active military service in the Royal Australian Naval Reserve that commenced in 1969, rising to the rank of Commodore, Cole served as Deputy Judge Advocate General of the Australian Defence Force between 1992 and 1998.

He was commissioner of the 2000-2003 Cole Royal Commission into the Building and Construction Industry and the 2005-2006 Cole Inquiry investigating allegations that AWB Limited paid illegal bribes to the Iraqi regime of Saddam Hussein in order to secure wheat sales to Iraq.

On 31 March 2008, Cole was appointed by the Chief of the Australian Defence Force to head an inquiry into the loss of the cruiser HMAS Sydney in a mutually destructive battle during World War II.

Honours
Cole was appointed an Officer of the Order of Australia in 2005 for services to the judiciary, particularly judicial administration, to reform of the building and construction industry, and to the community through the Australian Naval Reserve and conservation and arts organisations.

He received the Reserve Force Decoration in 1994 for fifteen years service to the Australian Naval Reserve.

References

1937 births
Living people
Judges of the Supreme Court of New South Wales
Australian King's Counsel
Australian royal commissioners
Sydney Law School alumni
People educated at Fort Street High School
Officers of the Order of Australia
Royal Australian Navy officers